Arkys lancearius, the triangular spider, is a common Australian spider belonging to the family Arkyidae. It is an ambush hunter, commonly found resting on leaves and ferns or hanging from just a few threads of silk. The front two pairs of legs are large, suited for grabbing small insects, while the rear pairs of legs are much smaller.

Description and habit
Body colour varies from yellow or orange to red with pale jewel-like markings on the heart shaped abdomen. Egg sacs are produced in January or February and are a deep pinkish cream colour. They are usually around 8 mm in diameter and are covered in lighter coloured threads. Each sac contains about 70 eggs, each 0.7 mm in diameter.

References

Araneomorphae
Spiders of Australia
Spiders described in 1837